Khlebnikov was an Imperial Russian jewelry firm, founded ca. 1867 by Ivan Khlebnikov in Saint Petersburg, but transferred to Moscow in 1871. 

The business was highly successful and received the Imperial Warrant, producing work of originality and highest quality using decoration in the traditional Russian style on many pieces. Enamel was a speciality, especially plique-à-jour, but also cloisonné. Demand for its work was high and in 1882 it employed 200 craftsmen. The business succumbed at the time of the Russian Revolution.

References

Companies established in 1867
Companies disestablished in the 1910s
Defunct companies of Russia
History of Saint Petersburg
19th century in Moscow